In the Hebrew Bible, Jethro (lit. "His Excellence/Posterity") was Moses' father-in-law, a Kenite shepherd and priest of Midian, sometimes named as Reuel (or Raguel). In Exodus, Moses' father-in-law is initially referred to as "Reuel" (Exodus 2:18) but afterwards as "Jethro" (Exodus 3:1). He was also identified as Hobab in the Book of Numbers 10:29.

Muslim scholars and the Druze identify Jethro with the prophet Shuayb, also said to come from Midian. For the Druze, Shuayb is considered the most important prophet, and the ancestor of all Druze.

In Exodus

Jethro is called a priest of Midian and became father-in-law of Moses after he gave his daughter, Zipporah, in marriage to Moses.

Jethro is recorded as living in Midian, a territory stretching along the eastern edge of the Gulf of Aqaba, northwestern Arabia. Some believe Midian is within the Sinai Peninsula. Biblical maps from antiquity show Midian on both locations.

Jethro's daughter, Zipporah, became Moses's wife after Moses had fled Egypt, having killed an Egyptian who was beating a Hebrew slave. Having fled to Midian, Moses intervened in a water-access dispute between Jethro's seven daughters and the local shepherds; Jethro consequently invited Moses into his home and offered him hospitality. However, Moses remained conscious that he was a stranger in exile, naming his first son (Jethro's grandson) "Gershom", meaning "stranger there".

Moses is said to have worked as a shepherd for Jethro for 40 years before returning to Egypt to lead the Hebrews to Canaan, the "promised land". After the Battle at Rephidim against the Amalekites, word reached Jethro that under Moses' leadership the Israelites had been delivered out of Egypt, so he set out to meet with Moses. They met in the wilderness at the "Mountain of God"; Moses recounted to Jethro all that had taken place, and then, according to Exodus 18:9–12a:

Following this event, it was Jethro who encouraged Moses to appoint others to share in the burden of ministry to the nation Israel by allowing others to help in the judgment of smaller matters coming before him.

These events take place in the Torah portion Yitro (Exodus 18:1–20:23).

Names

There is some disagreement over the name(s) of Moses' father-in-law. Reuel is noted , as "a priest of Midian" who had seven daughters. "the girls returned to Reuel their father". Reuel becomes Moses' father in law in  "Moses agreed to stay with the man, who gave his daughter Zipporah to Moses in marriage."

In Numbers 10:29, the Hebrew for the name Raguel is the same as the Hebrew for Reuel. Re-u-el, with the first syllable strong accented, is nearer to the true pronunciation. Some suppose that he was father to Hobab, who was also called Jethro, a likely possibility.

It became, however, generally accepted that he had seven names: "Reuel", "Jether", "Jethro", "Hobab", "Heber", "Keni" (comp. Judges i. 16, iv. 11), and "Putiel"; Eleazar's father-in-law (Ex. vi. 25) being identified with Jethro by interpreting his name either as "he who abandoned idolatry" or as "who fattened calves for the sake of sacrifices to the idol".

According to some modern scholars, "Jethro" was really a title meaning "His Excellency", and that "Reuel" was the figure's actual, given name.

Druze 

Jethro, Moses' non-Hebrew father-in-law, is a central figure, particularly in the rites and pilgrimages, of the Druze religion. He is called Shuayb and viewed as the most important prophet for the Druze. 

Nabi Shuʿayb is the site recognized by Druze as the tomb of Shuʿayb. It is located at Hittin in the Lower Galilee and is the holiest shrine and most important pilgrimage site for the Druze. Each year on 25 April, the Druze gather at the site in a holiday known as Ziyarat al-Nabi Shuʿayb to discuss community affairs and commemorate the anniversary of Jethro's death with singing, dancing and feasting. Another Druze shrine in Ein Qiniyye is the supposed burial place of Jethro's sister, Sit Shahwana.

Jethro is revered as the chief prophet in the Druze religion. They believe he was a "hidden" and "true prophet" who communicated directly with God and then passed on that knowledge to Moses, whom they describe as a "recognised" and "revealed prophet." According to Druze belief, Moses was allowed to wed Zipporah, the daughter of Jethro, after helping save his daughters and their flock from competing herdsmen. He is also considered an ancestor of the Druze; as is expressed by such prominent Druze as Amal Nasser el-Din, and according to Salman Tarif, who was a prominent Druze shaykh, this makes the Druze related to the Jews through marriage. This view has been used to represent an element of the special relationship between Israeli Jews and Druze. The Israeli Druze also have a folktale called "Jethro's revenge on the [Sunni Muslim] inhabitants of the village of Hittin."
In Islam he is mentioned in the Quran as a prophet who was sent to the city of Midian.  His people were destroyed because of their corruption except for the believers. He is thought to be the father-in-law for prophet Moses.

See also
 Jethro in rabbinic literature
 Moses in rabbinic literature
 Bithiah
 Jethro in Islam
Yathrib

Notes

External links
 Prophet Shoaib “Jethro”  Mosque and Tomb near Mahis

 
Midian
Converts to Judaism from paganism
Moses
Book of Exodus people
Prophets in the Druze faith
Ancient clergy
Kenites